BlueDot Inc. is a Canadian software company. The company's flagship product is Insights, a software-as-service used to map the spread of infectious diseases.

Description 
BlueDot was founded in 2013. According to the company's founder, BlueDot's initial business concept was inspired by the effects of the 2002–2004 SARS outbreak. The company secured $9.4 million in Series A funding in 2019, with its primary investors being Horizon Ventures, The Co-operators, and BDC Capital's Women in Technology Venture Fund.

BlueDot and its software received significant coverage during the COVID-19 pandemic. BlueDot software is being used to track outbreaks of COVID-19. While the WHO publicly warned of “pneumonia with an unknown cause” in China for the first time on January 5, BlueDot warned users six days earlier about the impending danger.

References 

Canadian companies established in 2009
Software associated with the COVID-19 pandemic